Jakub Čunta (born 28 August 1996) is a Slovak footballer who currently plays for Pohronie as a left back, in 2. Liga.

Club career

FK Senica
Čunta made his professional Fortuna Liga debut for Senica on 30 May 2015 against ŽP Šport Podbrezová.

References

External links
 FK Senica profile 
  
 Futbalnet profile 
 

1996 births
Living people
Footballers from Bratislava
Slovak footballers
Slovak expatriate footballers
Association football defenders
FK Senica players
MKS Cracovia (football) players
FC ŠTK 1914 Šamorín players
FK Pohronie players
Slovak Super Liga players
Ekstraklasa players
2. Liga (Slovakia) players
Expatriate footballers in Poland
Slovak expatriate sportspeople in Poland